Albína Dratvová (2 January 1892 – 1 December 1969) was a Czech philosopher, associate professor of philosophy at Charles University, one of the first few women to be habilitated during the First Czechoslovak Republic. She devoted herself to natural philosophy and methodology, the relationship between natural sciences and positivism. She also contributed significantly with her positions to the emancipation movement of modern women.

References

People from Prague
Czech women philosophers
1892 births
1969 deaths
Charles University alumni